George Litto (December 9, 1930 – April 29, 2019) was an American film producer and talent agent.  His production credits included Robert Altman's Thieves Like Us (1974), Jonathan Kaplan's cult film Over the Edge (1979), and three Brian De Palma thrillers, Obsession (1976), Dressed to Kill (1980) and Blow Out (1981).

References

External links
 

1930 births
2019 deaths
American film producers